The Weighted average cost of carbon is used in finance to measure a firm's specific cost of carbon. It expresses how much an organization is expending to either reduce carbon emissions internally (abatement) or offsetting externally (carbon offset). As such, the weighted average cost of carbon is the cost a company incurs to balance its carbon liability (carbon footprint).

It is a term with growing importance as legislation globally moves to internalize the impact of  emission through cost mechanisms.

The formula 

C = ((Va × Ea) + (Vo × Eo)) / L

How it works 

Corporations have multiple ways to balance their carbon liability. They can reduce their carbon emissions (their "carbon footprint") through capital investment, projects and demand reduction. They can purchase emission  permits, be allocated quotas (such as European Union Allowances (EUA)) or buy carbon credits. The latter are largely produced by CDM projects (Clean Development Mechanism) and Joint Initiatives. These credits are largely traded in form of Certified Emission Reduction (CER), or Emission Reduction Unit (ERU). Voluntary Emissions Reduction (VER) have a similar function but have not registered / cannot be registered under the rules of the Kyoto Protocol.

Relevance 

In a carbon constrained economy, the efficiency of corporations to respond to the cost factor carbon is an important indicator of competitiveness. Financial analysts are beginning to compare companies within industries based on their ability to either reduce their carbon footprint internally or offset carbon liabilities externally through comparatively low cost channels.

References

A good article that discusses the weighted average cost of carbon has been published by KyotoPlanet, view the eBook at http://kyotoplanet.newspaperdirect.com/epaper/viewer.aspx pages 98 –100

See also 
Weighted average cost of capital

Carbon finance